The New York City Police Commissioner is the head  of the New York City Police Department and presiding member of the Board of Commissioners. The commissioner is appointed by and serves at the pleasure of the mayor. The commissioner is responsible for the day-to-day operations of the department as well as the appointment of deputies including the Chief of Department and subordinate officers. Commissioners are civilian administrators, and they and their subordinate deputies are civilians under an oath of office, not sworn members of the force. This is a separate position from the Chief of Department, who is the senior sworn uniformed member of the force. The First Deputy Commissioner is the Commissioner and department's second-in-command. The office of the Police Commissioner is located at the NYPD Headquarters, One Police Plaza. Both the commissioner and first deputy commissioner outrank all uniformed officers, including the chief of department.

Theodore Roosevelt, in one of his final acts as Governor of New York before becoming Vice President of the United States in March 1901, continued reforms he began when he was police superintendent by signing legislation that replaced the police commission and office of the police chief (previously the superintendent) with a single police commissioner.

The current police commissioner is Keechant Sewell, who had previously been Chief of Detectives for the Nassau County Police Department. On December 14, 2021, the mayor-elect Eric Adams confirmed that he would appoint Sewell as the first female police commissioner of the NYPD. She took office on January 1, 2022.

The Commissioner's responsibilities include:

 To ensure the effective day-to-day operation of the department 
 To appoint the board of Commissioners, the Chief of the Department and all subordinate officers
 To ensure the safety and protection of New York City and its population
 To ensure the department enforces city, state and federal law

List of superintendents, chiefs, and commissioners

Pre-1901
Prior to 1901, the New York City Police Department was run by a board of four to six commissioners. The following is a list of some of the most famous members of the Police Commission:
Presidents of the Board of Commissioners

Members of the Board of Commissioners
 George Washington Matsell, 1845–1857, Superintendent
 John Alexander Kennedy, 1860–1863, Superintendent
 Abram Duryée, 1873–1874, Commissioner
 George Washington Walling, 1874–1885, Superintendent
 William Farrar Smith, 1875–1881, President of the Board of Commissioners
 Fitz John Porter, 1884–1888, Commissioner
 Frederick Dent Grant, 1894–1898, Commissioner
 Theodore Roosevelt, 1895–1897, President of the Board of Commissioners
 John McCullagh, 1897–1898, Superintendent
 John B. Sexton, 1898–1901, Commissioner
 William Stephen Devery, May 21, 1898 – June 30, 1898 (acting), June 30, 1898 – February 22, 1901. The superintendent title was changed to Chief of Police in 1898. Devery was the Police Department's last superintendent, and first chief.

Post-1901
Since 1901, a single commissioner has been in charge of the New York Police Department. The following is a list of the commissioners:

In popular culture
In the police procedural television show Blue Bloods, the fictional New York City Police Commissioner Frank Reagan is played by Tom Selleck. His father, Henry Reagan, played by Len Cariou, is a former Commissioner.

Salary

The public disclosure of salary as of 2020 is approximately $205,180.00 base, which is considered in line with what most large US cities pay their respective chief of police, and a bit lower than that of the chief of the Los Angeles Police Department.

Gallery

See also

 Lists of New York City topics
 List of New York City Police Department officers

References

External links

Police Commissioner page on the New York Police Department website

1845 establishments in New York (state)
Theodore Roosevelt